Elph is an extinct genus of dicynodont therapsids from Russia. Four specimens have been found from the Sokolki Assemblage in European Russia, representing a fauna that dates back to the Late Permian. Elph was a small herbivore that lived alongside carnivorous akidnognathids and inostranceviids, as well as larger herbivores like Dicynodon and pareiasaurids. The type species E. borealis was named in 1999. Elph has a short snout and tusks and is closely related to Interpresosaurus and Katumbia.

References

Dicynodonts
Anomodont genera
Lopingian synapsids of Europe
Permian Russia
Fossils of Russia
Fossil taxa described in 1999